Julien Michele Genre (born September 17, 1989) is an Italian curler.

Teams

Men's

Mixed

References

External links

Julien Michele Genre - Atleti - FISG - Federazione Italiana Sport del Ghiaccio (curler profile - Italian Ice Sports Federation)
Search Results for: Julien Genre - FISG - Federazione Italiana Sport del Ghiaccio

Living people
1989 births

Italian male curlers
Italian curling champions
Competitors at the 2013 Winter Universiade